Corseria corsica is a species of minute freshwater snail with an operculum, an aquatic gastropod mollusc or micromollusc in the family Moitessieriidae.

This species is endemic to France.

References

 Bernasconi, R. (1994). Le genre Moitessieria Bgt, 1863 en France: Révision, inventaire et description de M. corsica n. sp. (Mollusca Gasteropoda Prosobranchia Hydrobiidae). Mémoires de Biospéologie. 21: 7-20

Moitessieriidae
Endemic molluscs of Metropolitan France
Gastropods described in 1994
Taxonomy articles created by Polbot
Taxobox binomials not recognized by IUCN